Kakareza-ye Olya (also Romanized as Kākāreẕā-ye ‘Olya; also known as Emāmzādeh-ye Kākā Reẕā, Kākā Rezā, Kākā Rezā Bālā, Kākā Reẕā-ye ‘Olya, and Shahrak-e Kākā Reẕā-ye ‘Olyā) is a village in Honam Rural District, in the Central District of Selseleh County, Lorestan Province, Iran. At the 2006 census, its population was 60, in 12 families.

References 

Towns and villages in Selseleh County